The Song of Songs is a 1908 novel by the German writer Hermann Sudermann. It was published in English in 1909, translated by Thomas Seltzer. A new translation by Beatrice Marshall was published in 1913.

Adaptations
 1914: The Song of Songs, play by Edward Sheldon
 1918: The Song of Songs, film directed by Joseph Kaufman
 1924: Lily of the Dust, film directed by Dimitri Buchowetzki
 1933: The Song of Songs, film directed by Rouben Mamoulian
 1973: The Song of Songs, BBC Television mini-series (with Penelope Wilton as Lily)

References

Further reading

External links
 The Song of Songs at Project Gutenberg, Seltzer's translation
 The Song of Songs at Project Gutenberg, Marshall's translation

1908 German novels
German novels adapted into films
German-language novels
German novels adapted into plays
German novels adapted into television shows
Novels by Hermann Sudermann